The PBA Leo Awards, formerly known as the PBA MVP Awards Night (1975–1992) and PBA Annual Awards (1993–2002) is an annual awards ceremony of the Philippine Basketball Association to honor the achievements of its players for the season. The winners are awarded with The Leo, named in honor of the league's first commissioner, Leo Prieto.

Since the 2017–18 season, the Leo awards is held before the opening ceremonies of the new season. Before the 2017-18 season, the ceremony is usually held before the start of Game 4 of the best-of-seven finals series of the third conference of the season. If the finals series is a best-of-five affair, it is held before Game 3 of the series.

The Leo

The Leo is a statuette given by the Philippine Basketball Association to its seasonal awardees.

Introduced in 2003, it became the standard trophy of all awards given by the league for its season awards such as the Most Valuable Player, Mythical Team and others.

The statuette features a three-dimensional representation of the player depicted in the league's official logo. It was named in honor of Leopoldo "Leo" Prieto, the PBA's first commissioner.

Venues

See also
Philippine Basketball Association awards

Notes

References

Sports trophies and awards
Leo
Awards established in 2003